Scott Fletcher (born January 12, 1988) is an American former professional ice hockey defenseman. He most recently played with the Trenton Titans of the ECHL during the 2011–12 season.

Early life 
Fletcher was born in Haslett, Michigan. He grew up playing for the Honeybaked AAA Hockey Club in Oak Park, Michigan.

Career 
In 2004, Fletcher was drafted by the Saginaw Spirit in the second round (22nd overall) of the Ontario Hockey League Priority Selection. Before turning pro, he spent time with the Saginaw Spirit, Tri-City Storm of the USHL, Mississauga IceDogs, Niagara IceDogs, and Plymouth Whalers.

References

External links

1988 births
American men's ice hockey defensemen
Florida Everblades players
Ice hockey players from Michigan
Living people
Mississauga IceDogs players
Niagara IceDogs players
Plymouth Whalers players
Reading Royals players
Saginaw Spirit players
Toledo Walleye players
Trenton Titans players
Tri-City Storm players